Lan astaslem (Arabic: لن استسلم ) is an Arabic phrase meaning "I will not surrender". The term is used by Christians in reference to Aslim Taslam (Arabic:  أسلم تسلم) ("submit to Islam").

As resistance statement 
Oriana Fallaci, the Italian author and outspoken journalist, popularized the rejoinder lan astaslem.

Michelle Malkin has taken up this slogan as a response to the WTC terrorist attacks. T-shirts with lan astaslem have been produced, with all proceeds going to the Families of Freedom Scholarship Fund.

Submission
On September 17, 2006, in response to the Pope Benedict XVI Islam controversy, Imad Hamto, a Palestinian religious leader, said: "We want to use the words of the Prophet Muhammad and tell the pope: ‘Aslim Taslam'. This was interpreted as a threat.

References

Islam-related controversies
Criticism of Islam
Arabic words and phrases